Siesta is a 1987 film directed by Mary Lambert and starring Ellen Barkin, Gabriel Byrne and Jodie Foster. According to a 1987 article in The Los Angeles Times, the film "follows a daredevil through her final days leading up to a potentially fatal leap. Rife with Jungian imagery, the film is a post-modern fable of destiny and change, peopled with a gallery of lost souls including a guardian angel (played by British heartthrob Julian Sands), a sorceress (played by pop star Grace Jones) and the angel of death (Alexei Sayle)." It also stars Martin Sheen and Isabella Rossellini.

Cast
Ellen Barkin as Claire
Gabriel Byrne as Augustine
Julian Sands as Kit
Isabella Rossellini as Marie
Martin Sheen as Del
Alexei Sayle as Cabbie
Grace Jones as Conchita
Jodie Foster as Nancy
Anastassia Stakis as Desdra
Gary Cady as Roger

Production
The screenplay was written by Patricia Louisianna Knop, based on a novel by Patrice Chaplin. The film was shot on location in Spain, released by Lorimar Motion Pictures, and debuted in New York City on November 11, 1987. Jazz trumpeter Miles Davis performed on the score for the film, Music from Siesta, which was written and arranged by frequent Davis collaborator Marcus Miller.

Reaction
The film was nominated for an Independent Spirit Award for Best First Feature in 1988, for Director Mary Lambert.

Siesta received mixed reviews. On review aggregator Rotten Tomatoes, the film has a 14% approval rating based on 7 reviews. It was hailed as "this year's Blue Velvet" by Susan Linfield, editor of American Film. New York Times film critic Janet Maslin called it an "the kind of excitingly bad, artily experimental film that has become an endangered species... Still, Miss Lambert's first feature has a game, mischievous spirit and a ripe bohemianism that are appealing." Critic Roger Ebert wrote that "The film is finally overwhelmed by its own ambition, not to mention one too many gimmicks in its plot, but it goes down swinging." However, Sheila Benson of The Los Angeles Times called the film “a monumentally bad, awesomely wrongheaded, pretentious conceit."

References

Maslin, Janet (November 11, 1987). "Film: Exoticism in 'Siesta'". The New York Times. Retrieved on May 4, 2009.

External links

1987 films
American independent films
Films directed by Mary Lambert
1987 drama films
Films based on British novels
1987 independent films
1987 directorial debut films
1980s English-language films
1980s American films